CreteTV is a Greek regional television station, based in Heraklion. Its terrestrial transmission covers the region of Crete, while it also transmits via satellite through the Cosmote TV network.

References

External links
 

Television channels in Greece
Television channels and stations established in 1990
Mass media in Heraklion
Crete